Nerkin Giratagh is an abandoned village in the Kajaran Municipality of Syunik Province of Armenia.

History 
Nerkin Giratagh was formerly part of the rural community of Verin Giratagh, which was merged into the community of Lernadzor. Statistical Committee of Armenia reported that Nerqin Giratagh was uninhabited at the 2001 and 2011 censuses.

References 

Former populated places in Syunik Province